Curnon granulosa is a species of sea slug, a metarminid nudibranch, a marine gastropod mollusc in the family Curnonidae.

Etymology 
The genus name was originally a tribute to Dr. Jean Charcot, who led the expedition which discovered this species.

Distribution
This species was described from a single specimen found at 40 m depth at Booth Island, Antarctica. It has been described in more detail from specimens collected at Signy Island, Antarctica.

Description
The body of Curnon granulosa is translucent white with branches of the pink digestive gland showing through the skin. The mantle is bordered by an opaque white band and the dorsal surface is covered by pointed tubercles which are tipped with white pigment. The rhinophores are translucent and tipped with white.

References

External links
 Vayssière, A. (1906). Diagnoses génériques de Mollusques Gastéropodes nouveaux rapportés par l'Expédition Antarctique du Dr Charcot. Bulletin du Muséum d'Histoire Naturelle, Paris. 12(3): 147-149

Heterobranchia
Gastropods described in 1906